Last Seen Wearing may refer to:

 Last Seen Wearing ... (Hillary Waugh novel), a 1952 police procedural by Hillary Waugh
 Last Seen Wearing (Dexter novel), a 1976 Inspector Morse novel by Colin Dexter